The X Factor is a Greek and Cypriot television music competition to find new singing talent. The fifth series began airing on Skai TV and Sigma TV on April 27, 2017. Sakis Rouvas returned to present the main show on Skai TV for the fifth time and with Evagelia Aravani returned on Auditions Shows, Bootcamp, Chair Challenge and in Backstage at the Live Shows. Tamta was the only judge from the 4th series to return. Giorgos Mazonakis, Giorgos Papadopoulos and Babis Stokas are the new judges in the series, replacing George Theofanous, Peggy Zina and Thodoris Marantinis.

This year the teams are: the Boys with Tamta, the Girls with Giorgos Papadopoulos, the Over 25s with Giorgos Mazonakis and the Groups with Babis Stokas.

For the first time in The X Factor Greece the winner will not be from the Boys. The winner is Panagiotis Koufogiannis from the Over 25s.

Judges and presenters
On 22 November 2016, series 4 judge Peggy Zina announced that she would not come back for another series on the judging panel. On 15 February 2017, it was confirmed that Giorgos Theofanous would not return as a judge. Thodoris Marantinis confirmed he was leaving the judging panel on 17 February 2017. After 5 days, it was confirmed that three new judges Babis Stokas, Giorgos Papadopoulos and Giorgos Mazonakis may come to join Tamta on the judging panel.

In 9 March 2017, Sakis Rouvas 7 days after the final of The Voice of Greece where he was a coach of series 3 he confirmed that he would return to present for the fifth time The X Factor on Skai TV and Sigma TV. On 26 December 2016 it was confirmed that Evangelia Aravani would return to present the backstage of The X Factor Live for the second time.

Selection process

Auditions
The minimum age to audition this year was 16. Contestants needed three or more 'yeses' from the four judges to progress to Bootcamp.

Open Auditions
Producers auditions commenced on 14 January in Thessaloniki and ended on 23 January in Cyprus

Open Call
The Open Call that you listen for the last time the contestants was on 26 March 2017 in Athens.

Judges Auditions
The Judges' auditions started filming in April 2017. Selected auditions were broadcast over five episodes, between 27 April 2017 to 6 May 2017.

Bootcamp
Bootcamp started filming in April 2017, at O.A.C.A. Olympic Indoor Hall. It was broadcast in an episode with the final audition after this the bootcamp began for one hour on 6 May 2017. The contestants all chose their favourite song to sing and then they put them in groups and one by one sang, in front of the judges. Immediately after each performance, the judges would either put the acts through or eliminate them immediately. 120 acts were successful in this part, and the judges then deliberated to cut the number of contestants down to forty, to decide who would reach the four-chair challenge. At the end of Bootcamp, the judges discovered which categories they would mentor: Papadopoulos was given the Girls, Tamta was given the Boys, Mazonakis was given the Over 25s and Stokas was given the Groups.

Four-Chair Challenge
The Four-chair challenge took place from 22 to 25 April, at O.A.C.A. Olympic Indoor Hall. It was broadcast over four episodes, between 11 May to 26 May. Tamta chose her final four acts during Thursday 11 May show, Papadopoulos chose his final four acts during Friday 12 May show, Mazonakis chose his final four acts during Thursday 25 May show and Stokas chose his final four acts during Friday 26 May show.

Live Shows
In first sixth weeks the Lives where in Thursdays and from seventh week there was and Mondays and Thursdays. All the Lives was at 21:00 (with Greece time).

The first live aired in Thursday 1 June, the second in Thursday 8 June, the third in Thursday 15 June, the fourth in Thursday 22 June, the fifth in Thursday 29 June, the sixth in Thursday 6 July, the seventh aired in Monday 10 July, the eight in Thursday 13 July. The Semi-Final in Monday 17 July and the Final Thursday 20 July.

Contestants
The top 16 acts were confirmed as follows:

Key;
 – Winner
 – Runner-up
 – Third Place

Results Table
 
Key:

In Week 6 was announced that Coda Project will come back after public votes.

Final

Alone

Duet

References 

Greece 05
Skai TV original programming
2017 Greek television seasons